Zomicarpa is a genus of flowering plants in the family Araceae. It is endemic to eastern Brazil.

Species
Zomicarpa pythonium (Mart.) Schott - eastern Brazil
Zomicarpa steigeriana Maxim. ex Schott - Bahia

References

Aroideae
Araceae genera
Endemic flora of Brazil